William Stanbery (August 10, 1788 – January 23, 1873) was an American attorney and politician who served as a U.S. Representative from Ohio from 1827 to 1833.

Early life
Born in Essex County, New Jersey, Stanbery received an academic education and studied law in New York City.

Career
Stanbery was admitted to the bar in New York. It has been stated that he removed to Newark, Ohio in 1809. He was the first attorney to set up a law practice in Newark, where he was one of the old breed of lawyers who "rode the circuit" on horseback. He practiced in the federal courts with such notabables as Henry Clay and Thomas Ewing. He was elected to the Ohio Senate in 1824 and 1825.

U.S. House of Representatives 
He was elected a Jacksonian to the United States House of Representatives in 1827 to fill the vacancy caused by the death of William Wilson. He was reelected as a Jacksonian in 1828 and as an Anti-Jacksonian in 1830.

Attack
During his time in Congress, Stanbery was controversial. In April 1832, he made accusations about Sam Houston, who was visiting Washington, D.C. at the time, on the floor of the House. He was attacking President Andrew Jackson through Houston, and accused him of being in league with John Von Fossen and Robert Rose. The three men bid on the supplying of rations to Indians who were being forcibly removed because of Jackson's Indian Removal Act of 1830. Stanbery, now carrying two pistols and a dirk, refused to answer Houston's letters. Infuriated, Houston later confronted him on Pennsylvania Avenue as he left Mrs. Queen's boardinghouse and beat Stanbery with a hickory cane. Stanbery did manage to draw one of his pistols, place it at Houston's chest and pull the trigger, but it misfired.

Congress ordered Houston's arrest on April 17, who then hired Francis Scott Key as his attorney. He pleaded self-defense, but was found guilty in the high-profile trial. However, he was reprimanded lightly, thanks to high-placed friends, among them James K. Polk. Stanbery then filed charges against Houston in civil court. Judge William Cranch found Houston liable and fined him $500, which he never paid, before returning to the Mexican province of Texas.

Censure
On July 11, 1832, Stanbery was censured by the House of Representatives for saying of House Speaker Andrew Stevenson that his eye might be "too frequently turned from the chair you occupy toward the White House."

Later career
Stanbery was defeated for renomination in 1832. Afterwards, he resumed practicing law in Newark, where he died on January 23, 1873. He was interred in Cedar Hill Cemetery in Newark.

Personal life
Stanbery was married to Mary Shipley of New York City on June 14, 1809, in New York City. They had seven children, with all but the first born in Newark, Ohio: James Richmond (1810-1890), born in New York City, was a lawyer who married Eliza Rosalia Scofield (1811-1891); Wellington Washington, M.D. (1812-1888), a physician, who married Rebecca Ann Hendren (1822-1892); William (1816-1896), who married Jerusha Emma Woodbridge (1817-1891); Charlotte (1819-1897), who married Nathan B. Halliday (1812-1855); Frances (c. 1822-1893), who married Robert Impey (1815-1848); Byron (1824-1897), a farmer, who died unmarried; and Mary (1826-1913), who died unmarried.

A newspaper article that appeared in the Newark, Ohio, The Advocate on Sunday, January 20, 1985, erroneously reported that Dr. Edward Stanbery, William's younger half-brother who trained his son Wellington and admitted him to his practice, was an older brother to Wellington. This "fact" has now been widely reported on genealogy websites.

Stanbery's half-brother, Henry Stanbery, served as United States Attorney General under Andrew Johnson and resigned to defend Johnson during his impeachment trial.

See also
List of United States representatives expelled, censured, or reprimanded

References

External links

George Mason University's History News Network

Newspaper Article About Family: Kohser, Nina. "Stanbery family famous in Licking County past." The Advocate (Newark, Ohio). Sunday, Jan. 20, 1985. Page 2D.
Marriage Record: Ancestry.com. New York, U.S., Marriage Newspaper Extracts, 1801-1880 (Barber Collection) [database on-line]. Provo, UT, USA: Ancestry.com Operations Inc, 2005. Original data:Barber, Gertrude A., comp. Marriages taken from the "Brooklyn Eagle." Volumes 1-14. n.p.: n.p., 1963-66. Barber, Gertrude A., comp. Marriages taken from the New York Evening Post. Volumes 1-7. n.p.: n.p., 1933-??. Newspaper: New York Evening Post. Year: 1809: Page: 85. Date of Publication: Monday, October 30, 1809. Date of Marriage: June 14, 1809. "Wm Stanberry to Mary Shipply" [both names misspelled]. By Rev. Mr. Townley.

1788 births
1873 deaths
19th-century American politicians
Burials at Cedar Hill Cemetery, Newark, Ohio
Censured or reprimanded members of the United States House of Representatives
Jacksonian members of the United States House of Representatives from Ohio
National Republican Party members of the United States House of Representatives
Ohio lawyers
Ohio National Republicans
Ohio state senators
People from Essex County, New Jersey
Politicians from Newark, Ohio